Sendurai A. Mani is an Indian-American oncologist. He is a fellow of the American Association for the Advancement of Sciences and Associate Director for Legorreta Cancer Center at Alpert Medical School, Brown University. Previously, he was a co-director of Metastasis Research Center and co-director, Center for Stem Cell & Developmental Biology, and Professor of Translational Molecular Pathology at MD Anderson Cancer Center.

Biography

Sendurai Mani was born in a small town in the southern Indian state of Tamil Nadu. His parents never received a formal education, and are farmers. He completed his bachelor's and master's degrees at the  Madurai Kamaraj University. Dr. Mani then was accepted with a scholarship at the Indian Institute of Science. There he earned a Ph.D. in Biochemistry and Molecular Biology under Professor Govindarajan Padmanabhan, a former director of the Indian Institute of Science. Dr. Mani was the first person from his home town to earn a doctorate degree.

Dr. Mani then pursued postdoctoral work at the Whitehead Institute / Massachusetts Institute of Technology under the mentorship of Professor Robert Weinberg. As a postdoctoral fellow in the Weinberg lab Dr. Mani and his colleague Jing Yang demonstrated that the latent embryonic program known as the Epithelial-Mesenchymal Transition (EMT) is critical for the development of metastasis.

Dr. Mani joined the faculty of MD Anderson Cancer Center, Houston, Texas in 2007 and was promoted to Professor with Tenure. In 2022, Dr. Mani was appointed as an Associate Director for Translational Oncology at Legorreta Cancer Center, at Brown University and a Professor of Pathology and Laboratory Medciine in Warren Alpert Medical School at Brown University, Providence, Rhode Island. 

Dr. Mani's laboratory investigates how cancer cells develop to become metastatic. Dr. Mani was the first to demonstrate that cancer cells acquire stem cell properties by activating the EMT program, which allows them to survive better in the blood and establish a metastasis histopathologically similar to that of the parental primary tumor. In this highly influential article, Dr. Mani and colleagues identified various novel attributes of metastatic cancer cells and provided the foundation and an explanation for the presence of cellular plasticity within the tumor. Dr. Mani and his team continue to investigate ways to treat metastasis.

Dr. Mani co-founded SathGen Biotech, a subdivision of Godavari Biorefineries, with Samir Somaiya of Somaiya Group, Mumbai, India and he co-founded Iylon Precision Oncology with Sewanti Limaye.

Honors
 V-Scholar Award from the V Foundation
 The American Cancer Society Research Scholar Award 
 Elected member of the Scientific Research Honor Society Sigma Xi
 Elected fellow of the American Association for the Advancement of Sciences (AAAS)

References

External links
 

Living people
University of Texas MD Anderson Cancer Center faculty
Fellows of the American Association for the Advancement of Science
American oncologists
Madurai Kamaraj University alumni
Indian Institute of Science alumni
Massachusetts Institute of Technology alumni
Year of birth missing (living people)